Terry Knight and the Pack is the debut studio album for the American garage rock band, Terry Knight and the Pack.  On this record, future Grand Funk Railroad alumni such as Mark Farner, appear.  Vocalist Terry Knight wrote the bulk of the 12 tracks, barring the four cover versions.

Their biggest hit, appearing on this album,  called "I (Who Have Nothing)" became a  regional hit and charted at number 46, nationally. The band would be limited in their success due to Knight's dismal vocal range.

Track listing 
 All songs written by Terry Knight, except where noted.
 "Numbers"  2:25
 "What's on Your Mind"  1:45
 "Where Do You Go" (Sonny Bono) 3:05
 "You're a Better Man Than I" (Brian Hugg, Mike Hugg) 2:48
 "Lovin' Kind"  2:50
 "The Shut-In"  3:10
 "Got Love"  3:18 	  	
 "Change on the Way" 3:15
 "Lady Jane" (Mick Jagger, Keith Richards) 2:53
 "Sleep Talking"  3:02
 "I've Been Told"  2:20
 "I (Who Have Nothing)" (Carlo Donida, Jerry Leiber, Mike Stoller, Mogol) 3:05

Personnel  
 Terry Knight – vocals, piano, harpsichord, harmonica
 Bob Caldwell – organ, bells, vocals
 Curt Johnson – guitar, vocals
 Herm Jackson, Mark Farner – bass guitar
 Don Brewer – drums, percussion, vocals
 "Ralph" – additional drums and percussion
 Strings arranged by Richard Rome

References 

1966 debut albums
Lucky Eleven Records albums
Terry Knight and the Pack albums